Viktor Troicki was the defending champion but chose not to defend his title. Andrey Kuznetsov won the title, beating Daniel Brands 6–4, 6–3.

Seeds

Draw

Finals

Top half

Bottom half

References
 Main Draw
 Qualifying Draw

Citta di Como Challenger - Singles
Città di Como Challenger